Hengshan Road is a station on Line 1 of the Shanghai Metro, located along Hengshan Road in Xuhui District.

Places nearby
 Hengshan Road nightlife district

References

Line 1, Shanghai Metro
Shanghai Metro stations in Xuhui District
Railway stations in China opened in 1995
Railway stations in Shanghai